The 2016 West Florida Argonauts football team represented the University of West Florida in the 2016 NCAA Division II football season. They were led by head coach Pete Shinnick, who was in his first season at West Florida for the team's inaugural season.  The Argonauts played their home games at Blue Wahoos Stadium and were members of the Gulf South Conference. They finished the season with a record of 5 wins and 6 losses (5–6 overall, 3–5 in the GSC), defeating one top 25 ranked team and were not invited in the 2016 playoffs.

Schedule
West Florida announced its 2016 football schedule on August 10, 2015. The schedule consists of 5 home and 6 away games in the regular season. The Panthers will host GSC foes Shorter, West Alabama, West Florida, and West Georgia, and will travel to Delta State, Mississippi College, North Alabama, and Valdosta State.

The Argonauts will host only one non-conference game against Missouri S&T of the Great Lakes Valley Conference and travel to two against Ave Maria of the Sun Conference and Chowan of the Central Intercollegiate Athletic Association.

References

West Florida
West Florida Argonauts football seasons
West Florida Argonauts football